Río Blanco is a mountainous municipality in the San Marcos department of Guatemala at 2650 altitude. Mam and Spanish are spoken there.

Climate

Río Blanco has temperate climate (Köppen: Cwb).

See also

References

External links
 Some information in Spanish

Municipalities of the San Marcos Department